Specter is a Dutch surname. It is also of Ashkenazic Jewish origin, an occupational name of a teacher's assistant. It is also derivative of the Polish word inspektor, meaning supervisor. 

Notable people with this name include:
 Arlen Specter (1930-2012), American politician and lawyer, member of the US Senate
 Dave Specter (born 1963), American Chicago blues and jazz guitarist
 Joan Specter (born 1934), American businessperson and politician, widow of Arlen
 Michael Specter (born 1955), American journalist
 Ronnie Specter, American make-up artist

Fictional characters
 Harvey Specter, The main character of the television series Suits

References

See also
 Spector (disambiguation), which includes a list of people with the surname

Ashkenazi surnames
Dutch-language surnames